CAIS Software is an integrated development environment company based in the San Diego CA United States. The company was formed in the mid-1990s under the name Atcom/Info.  The IPORT division was acquired by Cisco Systems on October 20, 2000. The remaining assets of the company, including the CyberShell division, were sold on May 15, 2002.

References

Software companies based in California
Companies based in San Diego
Cisco Systems acquisitions
Defunct software companies of the United States